The women's super combined competition of the Vancouver 2010 Olympics was held at Whistler Creekside in Whistler, British Columbia, on February 18, 2010. The competition was originally scheduled to be held on February 14, 2010, but was postponed due to bad weather, which delayed previous events.

One major change in this event for the 2010 Olympics was the switch from a traditional dedicated "combined" (K), taking place over one or two days and involving a downhill run and two slalom runs (as the combined had been since its reintroduction to the Olympics in 1988), to a one-day "super combined" (SC), consisting of a downhill run in the morning and one slalom run in the afternoon.

Results

References

External links
2010 Winter Olympics results: Ladies' Super Combined, from https://web.archive.org/web/20091025194336/http://www.vancouver2010.com/; retrieved 2010-02-17.
Ski Racing.com - Olympics: Riesch gets combined gold as Vonn hooks gate, Mancuso big silver again - 2010-02-18

Winter Olympics
Combined